HMS Illustrious, a 74-gun third rate ship of the line and the second of that name,
was built by Randall & Brent at Rotherhithe where her keel was laid in February 1801. Launched on 3 September 1803, she was completed at Woolwich.
She was
first commissioned for the Channel Fleet under Captain Sir Charles Hamilton and was
involved in the Battle of the Basque Roads in 1809, in which she won a battle honour, and
in the expeditions against the docks at Antwerp and render the Schelde unnavigable to French ships.
On 22 November 1810, Illustrious was amongst the fleet that captured Île de France on 3 December. She then took part in the Invasion of Java (1811) in Indonesia.
She was refitted at Portsmouth (1813–17) and then laid up in reserve until recommissioned in 1832.
She was laid up again in 1845, and later used as a guard ship, a hospital ship and, lastly,
in 1854 she became a gunnery training ship and continued as one until she was broken up in 1868 in Portsmouth.

Notes, citations, and references
Notes

Citations

References

Lavery, Brian (2003) The Ship of the Line - Volume 1: The development of the battlefleet 1650-1850. Conway Maritime Press. .

Ships of the line of the Royal Navy
Fame-class ships of the line
1803 ships
Ships built in Rotherhithe